The 1963 La Flèche Wallonne was the 27th edition of La Flèche Wallonne cycle race and was held on 6 May 1963. The race started in Liège and finished in Charleroi. The race was won by Raymond Poulidor of the Mercier team.

General classification

References

1963 in road cycling
1963
1963 in Belgian sport
1963 Super Prestige Pernod